Valga is a town in southern Estonia and the capital of Valga County and Valga Parish. Until their separation in 1920, Valga and the town of Valka in northern Latvia were one town. They are now twin-towns. Their populations are respectively 12,261 and 6,164. On 21 December 2007 all border-crossing points were removed and roads and fences opened between the two countries with both countries joining the Schengen Agreement.

Location and transport

Valga is situated at the junction of roads and railways.

The Hummuli–Tartu–Riga railway is connected via Tapa with the Tallinn–Narva–St Petersburg main line. After closing April 2008 for extensive repair work Edelaraudtee railway services from other parts of Estonia to Valga re-opened in January 2010. From  2014 all domestic train services in Estonia are operated by Elron who runs three services a day from Valga to Tartu. The journeys either operate as through services to Tallinn or have a connection available at Tartu. The journey to Tartu takes around one hour and 15 minutes.

Valga is also an international railway junction; since April 2008 three daily trains operated by Pasažieru Vilciens from Riga which previously terminated at Lugaži have been extended across the border to Valga. The journey time to Riga is between 3h12m and 3h30m.

With the expansion of the Schengen Agreement and the abolition of systematic border controls between Estonia and Latvia, it was announced that common public bus transport would be launched between Valga and Valka.

During the Cold War, Valga was home to Valga air base.

Districts of Valga
There are six districts of Valga:
Kesklinn
Laatsi
Pilpaküla
Puraküla
Kapsamõisa (Raudteetaguse)
Tambre.

Activity
Since 1944, a local newspaper, Valgamaalane, has been published (3 times a week). Since 2003, there has also been a local newspaper "Walk" (in the Russian language). There also is a local correspondence office of Estonian Television (Eesti Televisioon) and a local radio – "Raadio Ruut".

The former municipality of Valga concluded several cooperation agreements. The nearest was an agreement (from the year 1995) with the neighbouring town of Valka. There were also cooperation agreements with Oakland, Maryland (US) and Östhammar Municipality (Sweden). There were long-term friendly relations with Hallsberg Municipality in Sweden and the towns of Lübz in Germany and Tornio in Finland.

Valga is developing quickly. Since 1996, the populace's quality of life has improved due to the renovation of several buildings, including the Central Library, Valga Stadium, the Museum, Valga Hospital, and the Culture and Hobby Centre. Step by step, the schools and kindergartens are also being modernized. Since 2003, a new water treatment plant has improved the quality of water in the town.

In the private sector, there have been extensive investments in trade, light industry, and forestry.

Population

Population change

Ethnic groups

Languages

Sports
Valga is home to several notable Estonian sports teams.

Warrior Valga, is a football club that currently plays in the III liiga. Warrior Valga played in the Meistriliiga from 2003 to 2006.

Valga, is a basketball club that currently plays in the Estonian top-tier Korvpalli Meistriliiga and the Baltic Basketball League.

Climate
Valga lies within the temperate humid continental climate zone.

History
 1286: Valga (under German name Walk) appears for the first time in the credit register of the city of Riga.
 1298, 1329, 1345: Walk suffers from looting raids made by Lithuanians who are led by Grand Duke Gediminas and Algirdas on the second and third occasions.
 1419: Walk becomes the seat of the Landtag of the Livonian Confederation.
 1481: A raid by Russians; the settlement burns down for the fourth time.
 1500: Walk, a settlement in the heart of Old Livonia that is not fortified, is chosen as the location for town assembly days 36 times up to 1500.
 1501: During another raid by Russians the settlement gets burnt down for the fifth time.
 1558: During the Livonian War the medieval settlement of Walk is completely destroyed.
 1584 11 June: Valga is granted the same charter and byelaws as Riga by Stefan Batory, the King of Poland.
 1590 17 April: The King of Poland, Sigismund III Vasa, ratifies the charter for the second time. Valga is granted its city arms.
 1600: The first town map, showing 42 house properties.
 1626: After the Polish-Swedish War Valga becomes the subject of Sweden. On 6 March, King Gustavus Adolphus of Sweden confirms the existing privileges.
 1657: On 9 July, a Swedish army under Friedrich von Löwen defeats a Russian army under Scheremetchev in the Battle of Walk.
 1721: As the result of the Great Northern War, Valga is subjected to Russian rule together with the rest of Estonia.
 1764 5 October: Empress Catherine II confirms the town's privileges.
 1783: During the Regency of Catherine II the Valga County (Kreis Walk) is formed.
 1780: The first stone buildings are erected: a church, a school and county offices.
 1789: Land surveyor O.S. Engell drafts the map of Valga showing 76 plots with houses.
 1816: The building of St. John's Church is finished.
 1876: Walkscher Anzeiger, the first newspaper in Valga, in German, is issued.
 1889: Valga Railway Station is opened. On 22 July the Tartu-Valga railway line is officially opened.
 1890 16 December: The Valga Temperance Society is founded.
 1896: The Pärnu-Valga narrow-gauge railway is opened.
 1901 7 December: Together with Latvians, Estonians succeed in winning the elections over Baltic Germans in Valga – the first occasion on Estonian territory. The chemist Johannes Märtson is elected mayor.
 1902: In the building of the Temperance Society the social society Säde is founded; Andres Alver, the county medical officer, is elected chairman. The Valga-Marienburg narrow-gauge railway is opened.
 1904 22 May: Estonian poet and writer Paul Viiding is born in Valga.
 1908 24 June: Estonian military commander Alfons Rebane is born in Valga.
 1908: The Girls' Progymnasium is changed into the Gymnasium with Marta Pärna as principal.
 1909: The construction of the Säde building is begun (architect Georg Hellat).
 1917: A German zeppelin flies over the town and drops forty high-explosive bombs without hitting the main target, the railway station.
 1918 11 January: The Council of Delegates of Valga County Workers, Soldiers and Landless Men gains power in the town. On 12 February the German Army occupies Valga.
 1919 11 January: The Valga Estonian Gymnasium is opened at 22 Kesk Street. For the first time in the history of secondary education in Valga the teaching language is Estonian instead of German. At the end of January, 107 victims of Bolshevik acts of terror are found in five mass graves around Valga; 67 people are taken away as hostages. On 31 January the Battle of Paju takes place and consequently Valga is freed from the Bolsheviks.
 1920 1 July: The British envoy Colonel S. G. Tallents conclusively establishes the border between Estonia and Latvia, putting an end to their disputes. Valga proper, as far as Konnaoja and Luke graveyard, remains intact under Estonian rule.
 1921 11 February: The decree of the Estonian government establishes the territory of Valga county. Valga becomes a county centre.
 1940 17 August: The Soviet occupation begins and with it the mass deportations of Estonians and Latvians from Valga/Valka
 1941 9 July: Valga is occupied by German troops.
 1944 19 September: In the course of heavy fighting Valga is liberated from the German occupation of Estonia. It is immediately replaced by the Soviet occupation of Estonia.
 1988. The Valga Society for the Protection of Antiquities is founded. On 27 November, on the initiative of the Society, the beginning of the War of Liberation is commemorated at the memorial for those killed in the war.
 1989 24 February: The first Estonian flag of the re-established independence period is hoisted on the flagpole of 12 Aia Street.
 1992 24 May: The Russian army base in Valga is taken over, and later on becomes the border guard's post.
 1993 17 October: The first free elections of the municipal council after the restoration of independence take place.
 1994 31 January: On the 75th anniversary of the battle of Paju a memorial to it is opened. On 21–25 June, worldwide days of Valga county people take place.

International relations

Twin towns – Sister cities
There former municipality of Valga, Estonia was twinned with:

City Twins Association

The former municipality of Valga was a founding member of City Twins Association that was founded in Imatra, Finland on 13 December 2006. In addition to sister towns, Valga had a cooperation through the association with following cities:

 Imatra, Finland
 Svetogorsk, Russia
 Narva, Estonia
 Ivangorod, Russia
 Görlitz, Germany
 Frankfurt (Oder), Germany
 Słubice, Poland
 Cieszyn, Poland

Cooperation without any formal agreement

 Vejle, Denmark
 Sátoraljaújhely, Hungary

Notable residents 

Kazimierz Świątek (Belarusian: Казімір Свёнтак, 1914 – 2011), first cardinal of the Roman Catholic Church in independent Belarus

Gallery

References
Notes

External links

Valga/Valka Illustrations and detailed descriptions of the border, in the period before Schengen

 
Cities and towns in Estonia
Former municipalities of Estonia
Valga
Divided cities
Estonia–Latvia border crossings
Kreis Walk